Viira is a village in Muhu Parish, Saare County in western Estonia.

References

 

Villages in Saare County